In stability theory, the Briggs–Bers criterion is a criterion for determining whether the trivial solution to a linear partial differential equation with constant coefficients is stable, convectively unstable or absolutely unstable. This is often useful in applied mathematics, especially in fluid dynamics, because linear PDEs often govern small perturbations to a system, and we are interested in whether such perturbations grow or decay. The Briggs–Bers criterion is named after R. J. Briggs and A. Bers.

Suppose that the PDE is of the form , where  is a function of space and time( and ).

Making this ansatz is equivalent to considering the problem in Fourier space – the solution may be decomposed into its Fourier components in space and time. Making this ansatz, the equation becomes

or, more simply,

The solutions to the dispersion relation may be complex-valued.

Now, an initial condition  can be written as a superposition of Fourier modes of the form . In practice, the initial condition will have components of all frequencies. Each of these components evolves according to the dispersion relation, and therefore the solution at a later time  may be obtained by Fourier inversion.

where

is the Fourier transform of the initial condition. In the more general case, the Fourier inversion must be performed by contour integration in the complex  and  planes.

In particular, we can determine whether  decays or grows exponentially in time, by considering the largest value that  may take.

Transient growth
Suppose the PDE is of the form

In general,  is not a normal operator.

In practice, the linear equations that we work with are linearisations of more complicated governing equations such as the Navier–Stokes equations about some base state, with the linearisations carried out under the assumption that the perturbation quantity  is small. Transient growth may violate this assumption. When nonlinear effects are considered, then a system may be unstable even if the linearised system is stable.

Generalisation
However, if the variation is very slow, then the WKBJ approximation may be used to derive a leading-order approximation to the solution. This gives rise to the theory of global modes, which was first developed by Philip Drazin in 1974.

References

Stability theory